The Louisville Cardinals football team represents the University of Louisville in the sport of American football. The Cardinals compete in the Football Bowl Subdivision (FBS) of the National Collegiate Athletic Association (NCAA) and are currently a member of the Atlantic Coast Conference.  The team’s current head coach is newly introduced Jeff Brohm. Brohm was introduced on December 8, 2022. The previous head coach was Scott Satterfield.

The Louisville Cardinals have played in 962 games since their inaugural 1912 season.  The Cardinals have appeared in 20 bowl games and have claimed 8 conference championships.  Louisville competes against the University of Kentucky Wildcats in the annual "Governor's Cup" rivalry game.  Six coaches have led the Cardinals to the postseason since 1912.

Key

Coaches

Notes

References

Louisville

Kentucky sports-related lists
Louisville, Kentucky-related lists